Terra Deva McNair is an American singer, songwriter, actor, and dancer known for her work in seasons 4 and 5 of The Disney Channel's Mickey Mouse Club. She has had continued success as a solo and collaborative artist.

Terra was born in Northern California. After many years of living in New York and London, she now lives in Los Angeles.

Early career
Her unusual pubescent workaholic ethic landed her first real job starring in the television show The Mickey Mouse Club for two seasons. She sang, acted, danced, and interviewed celebrities five days a week. At 16, she left Disney. 

Around 1993, Terra started going to raves and clubs. After meeting several British DJs and producers, she traveled back and forth to the United Kingdom to write and perform small shows. She also did jazz shows, funk shows, television and radio commercials, and industrial films in San Francisco.

Influences
Deva's work was influenced by Prince, Al Green, Bob Marley, Joni Mitchell, Cocteau Twins, PJ Harvey, Tori Amos, Björk, Seal, Joyce, Lenny Kravitz, and Nick Drake. She also appreciates the work of The Brand New Heavies, Deee-Lite, and underground dance vinyl.

Discography

Studio albums 

 Pulled Apart (1998)

Singles 

 Fresh Start (1997)
 Inside (1998)
 NRK ReMasters 003 (2005)
 NRK ReMasters 007 (2005)
 Easy / Sniff (unknown)

Guest appearances 

 Furry Phreaks - Want me (Like Water) (1995), Soothe (1998), and All Over The World (2007)
 Colourful Karma - For the Music (1999)
 Junior Jack - Thrill me / How you Thrill Me (2002)
 AK1200 - Fake (2002)
 Pete Moss - After 2 (2002)
 Who Da Funk  - Sting Me Red (Clever) (2002)
 Charles Webster - Ready (2002)
 Jimmy Van M & Young American Primitive - Forget Time (2002)
 Morillo - What Do You Want (2004)
 Bang On! Productions - Plush City (unknown)

Successful singles
Terra's most successful singles are: 

 "At Night" with Shakedown, which reached number 6 in the United Kingdom and was in the top ten in Europe
 "Sting Me Red (Clever)" with Who Da Funk
 "How You Thrill Me" with Junior Jack and Erick Morillo
 "Less Talk More Action" with Tim Deluxe

References

External links
 
 Terra Deva on Facebook
 Terra Deva on Instagram
 Terra Deva on Twitter
 Terra Deva on YouTube

Singers from California
Living people
American child actresses
Mouseketeers
1976 births